Charles Dzisah (born 25 September 1986) is a Ghanaian footballer who plays as a defender for Indian club Kalighat Milan Sangha FC.

Life 
Dzisah was born 1986 in Accra of a Togolese father and a Ghanaian mother. He raised in the city of Anloga in the Volta Region, Ghana and visit in this time the Tema Senior High School. He moved than 2004 for his studies to United Kingdom and visit the University of Oxford. In late 2005 he graduated at the University of Oxford.

Career 
The defender returned to the land of his forefather and started his professional career in 2006 with Togolese top side Abou Ossé F.C. He played two years for the Togolese Championnat National team Abou Ossé F.C., before moved in the spring 2008 to J-League club Nagoya Grampus. After one and a half year in Japan, was on 25 July 2009 signed by I-League club Viva Kerala, who played with country man Reuben Senyo. After the takeover of Chirag Computers from his club Viva Kerala, signed on 15. October 2011 for the refounded Chirag United Club Kerala. After one year with 1Chirag United Club Kerala, joined 17. October 2012 to League rival Mohammedan Sporting Club.

Mohammedan Sporting
In the I-League 2nd Division 2013, he scored the goal in the opening match of Group B on the 25th minutes, helping his side to a 2–1 win over Royal Wahingdoh F.C., on 9 March at Indore.

Kalighat Milan Sangha
He has already scored 7 goals for the Kalighat Milan Sangha F.C. in the Calcutta Premier Division 2013.

Career statistics

International career 
In May 2006, he played his debut for the Ghana national under-23 football team and was part of them until 2007.

References

1986 births
Living people
Ghanaian footballers
I-League players
Chirag United Club Kerala players
Togolese footballers
Footballers from Accra
Togolese people of Ghanaian descent
Expatriate footballers in Japan
Association football defenders
Ghanaian expatriate sportspeople in England
Ghanaian expatriate sportspeople in Japan
Togolese expatriate sportspeople in England
Togolese expatriate footballers
Ghanaian expatriate footballers
21st-century Togolese people